Toni Gräser (born 10 September 1933) is a Swiss racing cyclist. He rode in the 1957 Tour de France.

References

External links
 

1933 births
Living people
Swiss male cyclists
Place of birth missing (living people)
20th-century Swiss people
21st-century Swiss people